Stella quarta decima (Latin for "The Fourteenth Star") is a motto appearing on Vermont copper coinage struck in 1785 and 1786. The coins were issued during the period when Vermont was an independent state (1777–1791), sometimes referred to as the Vermont Republic.

The motto appears on the reverse of the coin and  encircles a corona of 13 small stars representing the existing U.S. states, with a large central star with an eye contained within. The motto expresses the then independent state's aspiration to join the United States as the fourteenth. The United States Congress admitted Vermont into the Union, as the fourteenth state, on March 4, 1791.

Usage in Latin motto

On April 10, 2015, an extended version of the phrase, "Stella quarta decima fulgeat," became the official state Latin motto. The Latin words translate as "May the fourteenth star shine bright."

References

 de Albuquerque, Martin. Notes and Queries: Medium of Inter-Communication for Literary Men, Artists, Antiquaries, Genealogists, Etc. Bell & Daldy, London: 1862.
 Doyle, William T. The Vermont Political Tradition and Those Who Helped Make It. Doyle Publisher: 1987. .
 Mussey, Barrows. Vermont Heritage, a Picture Story. A.A. Wyn, Inc.: 1947.
 Ryder, Hillyer. Colonial Coins of Vermont. Durst: 1982. .

External links

 United States Mint web page on Vermont coppers
 American Numismatic Association web site

Symbols of Vermont
Pre-statehood history of Vermont
Vermont Republic
Latin mottos